Rummikub is a tile-based game for 2 to 4 players, combining elements of the card game rummy and mahjong. There are 106 tiles in the game, including 104 numbered tiles (valued 1 to 13 in four different colors, two copies of each) and two jokers. Players have 14 or 16 tiles initially and take turns putting down tiles from their racks into sets (groups or runs) of at least three, drawing a tile if they cannot play. In the Sabra version (the most common and popular), the first player to use all their tiles scores a positive score based on the total of the other players' hands, while the losers get negative scores. There is also variations of the game, which contains 4 jokers. An important feature of the game is that players can move and edit the tiles that have already been placed on the table.

History
Rummikub was invented by Ephraim Hertzano, a Romanian-born Jew, who emigrated to Mandatory Palestine in the 1940s. He hand-made the first sets with his family in the backyard of his home. Hertzano sold these sets door-to-door and on a consignment basis at small shops. Over the years, the family licensed it to other countries and it became Israel's best-selling export game. In the 1970s it was brought to the United States by Irv and Arline Kossoff to sell in their New York’s Gift, Games, and Luggage store. Arline translated the rules from Hebrew to English and by 1977, it became a bestselling game in the United States. The game was marketed as "Rummikid" during part of the 1970s.

Hertzano's Official Rummikub Book, published in 1978, describes three different versions of the game: American, Sabra, and International. Modern Rummikub sets include only the Sabra version rules, with no mention of the others, and there are variations in the rules between publishers. The game was first made by Lemada Light Industries Ltd, founded by Hertzano in 1978.

Rummikub is similar to several central European card games which are played with two decks of playing cards, including Machiavelli and Vatikan. Vatikan is played with two decks of cards and one joker per player, thus making 106 cards for two players.

In Turkey, the game is known as Okey and is widely played by families at gatherings or at local cafes.

Game pieces

Rummikub's main component is a pool of tiles, consisting of 104 number tiles and two joker tiles. The number tiles range in value from one to thirteen in four colors (blue, red, yellow, and black). Each combination of color and number is represented twice. Players each have a rack to store tiles without revealing the face of the tiles  to the other player(s).

Rules
The following explanation is based on the rules in the 1998 Pressman American edition:

Setup

Tiles are shuffled together and either placed into a bag or spread out face down across the table. Each player draws and reveals one tile. The player whose tile has the highest number value will start the game. Tiles are returned to the pool, and players collect 14 random tiles and arrange them on their racks. Play begins with the starting player and proceeds in a clockwise (for modern variants) direction.

Play
For the first player’s move, they must play a set (or sets in some versions) with a value of at least 30 points. Point values are taken from the face value of each tile played, with the joker (if played) assuming the value of the tile it is being used in place of. A player may not use other players' tiles to make the "initial meld". If a player cannot make an initial meld, they must pick up a single tile from the pool and add it to their rack. Play then proceeds to the next player.

Once a player has made their initial meld, they can, on a separate turn, play one or more tiles from their rack, making or adding to groups and/or runs. If the player cannot (or chooses not to) play any tiles, they must pick a tile randomly from the pool and add it to their rack.

Players may not make their initial meld and along with that play on groups and runs during the same turn. You can play on runs and groups after the turn of making the initial meld.

Players may play tiles by amending sets already in play. The only limit to the length of a run is the extremes of the tile values.  Groups are limited to four because colors may not repeat within a group.

Sets
All tiles in play must be arranged in sets of at least three tiles. The two valid set types are called runs and groups.

A run is composed of three or more, same-colored tiles, in consecutive number order. (A 1 may not follow a 13.)
{|
|- style="line-height: 3em;"
| Example run:  ||    
|}

A group is made from three or four same-value tiles in distinct colors. For example: red 3, blue 3, black 3 and yellow 3.

{|
|- style="line-height: 3em;"
| Example group:  ||   
|}

Examples of invalid sets 
{|
|- style="line-height: 3em;"
| Invalid because numbers are not consecutive: ||   
|- style="line-height: 3em;"
| Invalid because numbers in a run must all be the same color:  ||   
|- style="line-height: 3em;"
| Invalid because colors may not repeat in a group: 
 ||   
|}

Example of play 
{|
|- style="line-height: 3em;"
| Tiles already out-played: ||   
|- style="line-height: 3em;"
| Own tiles:  ||   
|- style="line-height: 3em;"
| Recombined result:  ||    and   
|}

Manipulating existing tiles 
During a player's turn, sets of tiles that have already been played may be manipulated to allow more tiles to be played. At the end of the turn, all played tiles must be in valid sets.

 Shifting a run  Players may add the appropriate tile to either end of a run and remove a tile from the other end for use elsewhere.  If red 3, 4, and 5 have already been played, a player may add the red 6 to the end and remove the 3 for use elsewhere.
 Splitting a run  Players may split long runs and insert the corresponding tiles in the middle.  Thus, if blue 6, 7, 8, 9, and 10 are already a run, the player may insert their own 8 to make two runs: 6, 7, 8 and 8, 9, 10.
 Substituting in a group  Players may replace any of the tiles in a three-tile group with a tile of the fourth color and the same value.  If blue 6, red 6, and yellow 6 are already a group, the player may add the black 6 and remove any one of the other three for use elsewhere.
 Removing tiles  So long as the remaining tiles form a valid run, tiles can be removed from the ends of runs.  Any one tile may be removed from a four-tile group.
 Joker substitution A joker may not be retrieved before the initial meld. A joker can be retrieved from a set  by replacing it with a tile of the same numerical value and colour it represents. The tile used to replace the joker can come from the player's rack or from the table. In the case of a group of 3, the joker can be replaced by the tile of either of the missing colours. A joker that has been replaced must be used in the player's same turn as part of a new set. A set containing a joker can have tiles added to it, be split apart or have tiles removed from it. The joker can be moved or replaced in any possible way as long as you maintain a set of at least three tiles. The joker has a penalty value of 30 points if it remains on a player's rack at the end of the game
 Harvested tiles  In the course of a turn, a tile that is "harvested" from an existing set must be played during the turn; it cannot be kept for later use. Example: if there is a 3, 4, 5 run on the table, the 3 can be harvested by putting down the appropriately colored 6, but the 3 must be used during that turn, not kept in the player's hand for later use.

Scoring
Once a winner has been declared, the losing players must add up the values of the tiles remaining in their racks (their score for the game). The joker has a penalty value of 30. A player's score for the game is subtracted from their current cumulative score. Once calculated, each of the losing players' scores for the game is added to the winners current cumulative score.

For example- suppose in a game player A wins, player B has a score of 5, player C has a score of 10 and player D a score of 3. Player A will now have a cumulative score of 18, player B will be −5, player C will be −10 and player D will be −3.

Should the game result in no winner, the player with the lowest number of tiles in their rack is the winner. Scoring is then carried out in the normal manner.

If one person never had the required points to make a meld and the game is over, their points are added to the score of each of the other players.  The person with the fewest points is the winner.

Winning
Game play continues until a player has used all of the tiles in the rack, at which point they should call out "Rummikub," and are declared the winner. If the pool runs out of tiles, play continues until there is a winner or no player can make a valid play.

Rule Variations

 Draw Two / River 

 Draw two - when you cannot or do not want to add a tile, you can draw from the Pool. To draw, pick up two (2) tiles, discard one (1) to the River, and place the other on your Rack, ending your turn. (The River is a row of tiles discarded during a draw. They must be kept in order of discard.)

 Pull from River - when you want a particular Tile from the River, you must pick up all the Tiles preceding it. Tiles are added to the River from left to right. So, the oldest Tile is to the far left, and the newest is to the far right. The oldest Tile that you pick up in the River is the Key Tile and must be played during that turn. The remaining tiles pulled from the River are called the Plunder. All of the Plunder Tiles must be placed on your Rack and cannot be used this turn. Once you play the Key Tile your turn is over. You can use any tiles already on your rack in order to use the Key Tile.

Reception
Games magazine included the game as Rummy-O II in their "Top 100 Games of 1980", noting the appeal of playing with tiles rather than cards for "the sound of snapping them onto the table when making a strong play".

Awards
1980 Spiel des Jahres (German Game of the Year)
1983 Spel van het Jaar (Dutch Game of the Year).
1993  (Polish Game of the Year)

See also

Israeli inventions and discoveries
Okey

References

External links
 
 Board Game Halv Reference Page

Board games introduced in 1977
Rummy
Products of Israel
Tile-based board games
Spiel des Jahres winners
Pressman Toy Corporation games
Ravensburger games
Israeli inventions
Israeli games